Edner Elisma (born April 9, 1975) is an American former professional basketball player who last played for Indios de San Francisco in Dominican Republic. In 1997–98 he was the top rebounder in the Israel Basketball Premier League.

College basketball

Ed Elisma, a top recruit out of high school, played for the Georgia Tech basketball team, where he finished four-year stint as the school's third all-time leading shot-blocker, behind only former NBA players John Salley and Malcolm Mackey. Among his teammates were future NBA players Stephon Marbury, Travis Best, Matt Harpring and Drew Barry. Elisma started the last 93 games of his career at center for the Yellow Jackets. 

Career highs include 36 points against Wake Forest and 15 rebounds against Louisville in his senior season. In 122 games, he averaged 7.4 points, 6.3 rebounds and 1.5 blocks a game on 55.0 percent field-goal shooting.

After his solid four-year college career, Elisma participated in the Portsmouth Invitational Tournament and the Nike Desert Classic prior to the NBA Draft. He entered the 1997 NBA Draft and was selected as the #41 pick by the Seattle SuperSonics.

Professional career
Elisma did not sign a contract with the Sonics and moved to play in Israel with a team called Hapoel Eilat, whom he led to the 1998 playoffs final. In 1997–98 he was the top rebounder in the Israel Basketball Premier League. Afterwards he left to play in Italy for the season.

Elisma also played in Belgium, Puerto Rico, the Dominican Republic and Venezuela before he returned to Israel. He has played in various summer leagues with the Seattle SuperSonics, Boston Celtics, and Toronto Raptors and also the ABA. He also played in the Philippines and Iran.

Career statistics

|-
| align="center" colspan=8|7 seasons
|-
| align="center" style="background: #f0f0f0"|Season
| align="center" style="background: #f0f0f0"|Team
| align="center" style="background: #f0f0f0"|Pts Avg
| align="center" style="background: #f0f0f0"|Rebs Avg
| align="center" style="background: #f0f0f0"|
| align="center" style="background: #f0f0f0"|
|-
|  1997–1998 ||Hapoel Eilat (Israel) ||17.0 points ||9.4 rebounds || – || – 
|-
|  1998–1999 ||Muller Verona (Italian A-1 League), B. Sardegna Sassari (Italian A-2 League) || 12.1 points ||9.7 rebounds || – || – 
|-
|  1999–2000 ||Spirou Charleroi (Belgium) ||10.7 points ||7.5 rebounds || – || – 
|-
|  2000–2001 ||Chicago Skyliners (ABA) ||11.5 points ||6.8 rebounds || – || – 
|-
|  2001–2002 ||Ironi Ramat Gan (Israel) ||11.0 points ||5.5 rebounds || – || – 
|-
|  2002–2003 ||Asheville Altitude (National Basketball Development League) ||6.1 points ||4.3 rebounds ||1.1 assists || 20.9 minutes 
|-

References

External links

NBDL profile @ NBA.com
Matt Harpring on Elisma
college stats

1975 births
Living people
American expatriate basketball people in Belgium
American expatriate basketball people in China
American expatriate basketball people in the Dominican Republic
American expatriate basketball people in Iran
American expatriate basketball people in Israel
American expatriate basketball people in Italy
American expatriate basketball people in Mexico
American expatriate basketball people in the Philippines
American men's basketball players
Asheville Altitude players
Barangay Ginebra San Miguel players
Basketball players from Miami
Centers (basketball)
Cocodrilos de Caracas players
Dinamo Sassari players
Georgia Tech Yellow Jackets men's basketball players
Guaiqueríes de Margarita players
Halcones Rojos Veracruz players
Hapoel Eilat basketball players
Ironi Ramat Gan players
Israeli Basketball Premier League players
Leones de Ponce basketball players
Magnolia Hotshots players
Petrochimi Bandar Imam BC players
Philippine Basketball Association imports
Power forwards (basketball)
Scaligera Basket Verona players
Seattle SuperSonics draft picks
Shandong Hi-Speed Kirin players
Shanxi Loongs players
Spirou Charleroi players